Forest Hill Village is a census-designated place (CDP) in Flathead County, Montana, United States. The population was 206 at the 2010 census. It is located on U.S. Route 93, 6 miles south of Kalispell. It is just north of Flathead Lake.

Demographics

References

Census-designated places in Flathead County, Montana
Census-designated places in Montana